Jet2.com Limited is a British low-cost leisure airline offering scheduled and charter flights from the United Kingdom. As of 2022, it is the third-largest scheduled airline in the UK, behind easyJet and British Airways. Jet2 is also officially the largest tour operator in the UK after overtaking TUI in 2023. Its headquarters are located at Leeds Bradford Airport. Further bases are at Belfast–International, Birmingham, Bristol, East Midlands, Edinburgh, Glasgow, London–Stansted, Manchester and Newcastle airports. The company holds a United Kingdom Civil Aviation Authority Type A Operating Licence to carry passengers, cargo and mail on aircraft with 20 or more seats. Jet2 also offers a charter service through its Jet2charters brand.

History

Origins
Jet2.com Limited is a subsidiary of Jet2 plc, an aviation services group. The airline began operating commercial aircraft in 1983 under the name Channel Express, when it was purchased by the Dart Group's current Executive Chairman, Philip Meeson. Initially, a freight operator, from 2001 the airline also began operating passenger charter services using Boeing aircraft to international destinations on mainly short and medium-haul routes.

Formative years

In 2002, Channel Express established the Jet2.com brand from Leeds Bradford International Airport. The re-branded Jet2.com began operating as a leisure airline with its first flight from Leeds Bradford to Amsterdam on 12 February 2003, which operated a twice-daily rotation with two Boeing 737-300 aircraft. During 2003, further scheduled flights were launched to seven European sun and city break destinations.

In 2004, a second base was opened at Manchester Airport with the airline operating from Terminal 1. The airline also acquired further Boeing 737 and 757 aircraft and opened a base at Belfast International Airport. In 2005, Jet2.com opened a third base at Newcastle upon Tyne. Later in the year, the company acquired two Boeing 757-200 aircraft, enabling it to fly medium-long haul destinations as well as carrying more passengers on popular existing routes. These aircraft helped the company to open two more bases at Blackpool and Edinburgh. In 2006, the company relocated from Bournemouth to Leeds and was renamed Jet2.com Limited.

Expansion 
In November 2008, Jet2.com changed its slogan from "The North's Low Cost Airline" to "Friendly Low Fares". This preceded the announcement of opening a hub at East Midlands Airport, the first of the airline's hubs outside the North of England and Scotland. The base at East Midlands Airport opened in May 2010.

During November and December 2008 the airline operated four direct flights from Leeds Bradford to Newark Liberty International Airport using Boeing 757-200s, with a series of flights also planned from both Leeds Bradford and Newcastle during December 2010. Once again, Jet2.com re-introduced seasonal Christmas flights to New York during the 2012 winter season, however, this time flights would operate from Glasgow, East Midlands and Newcastle, in addition to Leeds. The seasonal flights to New York have continued annually and now run from five of its UK bases.

In 2010, the airline announced an eighth base at Glasgow Airport would be opened in April 2011, with an initial nine routes. The base was opened on 31 March, slightly earlier than scheduled. In January 2011, the airline introduced second-hand Boeing 737-800 aircraft into its fleet. This provided aircraft larger than its existing 737-300s yet smaller than its 757-200 aircraft.

Jet2.com carried over 600,000 passengers in its first year of operation and over nine million passengers during 2017; its highest recorded total.

On 17 September 2016, the airline received its first brand new Boeing 737-800 of the order for thirty made in 2015. In September 2016, Jet2.com announced it would begin operations from Birmingham Airport and London Stansted Airport (the airline's first base in southern England) in March 2017. In November 2016, Jet2.com opened its new maintenance hangar at Manchester Airport. In December 2016, Jet2.com announced that it had ordered a further four Boeing 737-800 aircraft, bringing the total on order to 34.

Recent years 
In 2019, Jet2.com received delivery of its 34th new Boeing 737-800 aircraft, taking its permanent and leased fleet size to over 100 aircraft. Also in 2019, Jet2.com carried a record 14.39 million passengers on 82,931 flights. This was an increase of over 18% over the year prior. 

Owing to the COVID-19 pandemic's impact on aviation, Jet2.com announced they were suspending flight operations until at least 15 July 2020. The airline continued to operate repatriation flights for British citizens overseas. On 17 Aug 2020, Jet2 announced via BALPA, that they would be laying off 102 pilots from various UK bases, due to the COVID-19 pandemic.

On 11 November 2020, Jet2.com and Jet2holidays announced that they would open their tenth UK base at Bristol Airport on 1 July 2021, operating to 33 destinations.

In June 2021, Jet2.com announced that it had pushed back a planned restart of operations to 1 July 2021 in the wake of the latest changes to government travel regulations. In September 2021, Jet2.com announced an order for 36 Airbus A321neo aircraft, plus 24 options, totalling purchasing power for 60 planes. Although Jet2 has operated a small number of Airbus jets on lease to cope with summer demand, this is Airbus' first direct order from Jet2, and a shift away from the company's traditionally all-Boeing fleet.

Jet2.com celebrated its 20th birthday on 12 February 2023. On the same date it was revealed that Jet2holidays had become the UK's largest tour operator with an ATOL license to carry 5.8m passengers, surpassing TUI's 5.3m.

Corporate affairs

Subsidiaries 
In 2007, sister company Jet2holidays was launched offering package holidays. On 29 April 2015, sister company Jet2CityBreaks was launched. In June 2017, Jet2.com launched Jet2Villas through its Jet2holidays brand.

Ownership 
Jet2.com is wholly owned by Jet2 plc (formerly Dart Group PLC), a holding company based in Leeds, England.

Head office

Jet2.com's Registered office, Low Fare Finder House, is located on the grounds of Leeds Bradford International Airport. Construction of the facility broke ground in 2006, in order to accommodate pilots, cabin crew, and back of house operations. In April 2013, Jet2.com moved its Customer Contact, Finance, IT, Human Resources, Commercial and Marketing departments to a new office, “Holiday House", located within the city centre of Leeds. In September 2014, the airline opened a new £9.5 million training academy at Euroway Industrial Estate in Bradford. In addition to the training centre located in Bradford, Jet2.com announced in February 2023 that they'd opened a new £8.5 million training centre in Cheadle. Both training centres will operate in parallel.

Statistics

Destinations

Jet2.com operates flights to 70 destinations in Europe, with a focus on Spain, the Mediterranean Sea, France, Greece, Italy and Turkey. Its main base is at Leeds Bradford Airport with nine additional operating bases across the United Kingdom alongside overseas bases at Alicante–Elche Airport, Palma de Mallorca Airport and Tenerife South Airport.

Fleet

Current fleet
, the Jet2.com fleet consists of the following aircraft:

In addition to the above fleet, Jet2.com commonly damp-leases additional aircraft to support it’s operation during busy periods. In the past, such aircraft included Airbus A321s from Titan Airways and HiFly along with Airbus A330s from AirTanker. The Summer 2023 period will see the return of the Titan Airways, HiFly and AirTanker aircraft, along with AirExplore, Smartwings and World2Fly Portugal aircraft supporting in the operation.

Future fleet
In October 2021, Jet2.com announced that they had placed an order with Airbus to purchase multiple Airbus A321neo aircraft to replace their Boeing 757 aircraft. In July 2022, Jet2.com further announced that they had expanded their order with Airbus, ordering a total of 60 A321neo aircraft. In October 2022, Jet2.com announced an additional order for 35 Airbus A320neo aircraft.

Former fleet

Accidents and incidents
On 10 April 2017 a Jet2.com Boeing 757-200 (Registration G-LSAI) suffered a tailstrike during landing at Alicante–Elche Miguel Hernández Airport, damaging the area around the lower tail. The Spanish Civil Aviation Accident and Incident Investigation Commission determined the copilot, who was flying, left the nose too high during the landing and the captain failed to intervene. The copilot, who was on his final day of training after working for Jet2.com for two years, reported to investigators he felt stressed due to pressure from Jet2.com and was sleeping poorly. Jet2.com fired the copilot following the accident.

References

External links

Jet2.com website
Jet2holidays website
Jet2charters website

Airlines of the United Kingdom
British Air Transport Association
European Low Fares Airline Association
Airlines for Europe
Airlines established in 2002
Low-cost carriers
Companies based in Leeds
British brands
British companies established in 2002